The Cambodian League Cup previously known as CNCC League Cup is a soccer cup tournament in Cambodia. 

The Cambodian National Competitions Committee (CNCC) planned to hold the 1st edition of the tournament in 2021. However, it was cancelled during the final stage of tournament due to problems relating to COVID-19. The tournament was brought back by the newly established Cambodian Football League Company in 2022 to ensure players from both divisions are active during 2021 Southeast Asian Games period.

Format
 

Entry is open to all teams that compete in the Cambodian League and the Cambodian  League 2. Teams will be drawn into 2 groups, and the 1st and 2nd place team from both groups will qualify for the semi-final. The tournament will not use the away goals rule and will go into overtime and penalty shootout for the tiebreaker if necessary.

2022 season and clubs

References

Football in Cambodia